Matteo Campani (born 19 August 2000) is an Italian professional footballer who plays as a goalkeeper for  club Vis Pesaro, on loan from Sassuolo.

Career
Campani was raised in the youth teams of Pisa and began to receive call-ups to the senior squad late in the 2016–17 Serie B season. He made his senior debut for Pisa on 29 July 2018 in a Coppa Italia game against Triestina. The game reached the shoot-out and Pisa advanced thanks to a kick saved by Campani. In the next Cup round, he saved two penalties again in the shoot-out to eliminate Cremonese. In the next round, Pisa eliminated Parma as Campani kept a clean sheet.

On 17 August 2018 (5 days after the Parma game), Campani signed with the Serie A club Sassuolo, where he was assigned to the Under-19 squad.

On 30 July 2019, he joined Serie C club Paganese on a season-long loan. He made his professional Serie C debut for Paganese on 27 October 2019 in a game against Picerno. He started the game and played the full match as Paganese lost 0–2. On 21 August 2020 the loan has been extended.

On 17 July 2021, he moved on a new loan to Serie C club Vis Pesaro. The loan was renewed for the 2022–23 season.

References

External links
 
 

2000 births
Living people
Footballers from Florence
Italian footballers
Association football goalkeepers
Serie C players
Pisa S.C. players
Paganese Calcio 1926 players
Vis Pesaro dal 1898 players